Benediktsson is a surname of Icelandic origin, meaning son of Benedikt. In Icelandic names, the name is not strictly a surname, but a patronymic. The name refers to:
Bjarni Benediktsson (born 1908) (1908–1970), Icelandic politician; Prime Minister of Iceland 1963–70
Bjarni Benediktsson (born 1970), Icelandic politician, Minister of Finance since 2013, grand-nephew of the latter
Einar Benediktsson (1864–1940), Icelandic lawyer, poet, and translator
Einar Örn Benediktsson (born 1962), Icelandic pop singer and trumpet player

Icelandic-language surnames